The canton of Firminy is a French administrative division located in the department of Loire and the Auvergne-Rhône-Alpes region. It includes the following communes:
Caloire
Firminy
Fraisses
Saint-Paul-en-Cornillon
Unieux

See also
Cantons of the Loire department

References

Cantons of Loire (department)